15 Andromedae, abbreviated 15 And, is a single, variable star in the northern constellation of Andromeda. 15 Andromedae is the Flamsteed designation, while its variable star designation is V340 And. Its apparent visual magnitude is 5.55, which indicates it is faintly visible to the naked eye. Its estimated distance from the Earth is 252 light years, and it is moving further away with a heliocentric radial velocity of 13 km/s.

Depending on the source, this star has been classified as a giant star with a stellar classification of A1 III, an A-type main-sequence star with a class of A1 Va, or a Lambda Boötis star with a class of kA1hA3mA0.5 Va+. It is a Delta Scuti variable that changes in brightness by 0.03 magnitude. Two variability cycles, with periods 0.0403 and 0.0449 days, have been observed, a common feature for Lambda Boötis stars. The star is around 130 million years old and has a high rotation rate, showing a projected rotational velocity of 105 km/s. It has 2.7 times the mass of the Sun and is radiating 27 times the Sun's luminosity from its photosphere at an effective temperature of 9,225 K.

This system has an excess emission of infrared radiation that suggests the presence of an orbiting disk of dust at a distance of around 50 AU from the host star.

References

External links
 Image 15 Andromedae

A-type giants
A-type main-sequence stars
Delta Scuti variables
Lambda Boötis stars

Andromeda (constellation)
Durchmusterung objects
Andromedae, 15
221756
116354
8947
Andromedae, V340